Rebecca J. Millett (born October 5, 1962) is an American politician from Maine. Millett is a Democratic State Senator from Maine's 29th District, representing South Portland, Cape Elizabeth and part of Scarborough. From 2004 to 2010, Millett served on the Cape Elizabeth School Board. She won a primary for Senate 29 over South Portland Representative Bryan Kaenrath in June 2012 and was first elected to the Maine State Senate the following November after defeating Republican Mike Wallace. The seat was held by Larry Bliss until his mid-term resignation in 2011. He was replaced by Cape Elizabeth resident and State Representative Cynthia Dill, who in turn decided not to seek a full term and instead to pursue the open seat in the United States Senate.

Millett grew up in Portland, Maine and attended area public schools. She earned a BA and BS from American University in Washington D.C. and an MBA in finance from the University of Chicago.

References

1962 births
Living people
Democratic Party Maine state senators
Politicians from Portland, Maine
People from Cape Elizabeth, Maine
American University alumni
University of Chicago Booth School of Business alumni
School board members in Maine
Women state legislators in Maine
21st-century American politicians
21st-century American women politicians